The Colorado Party is a liberal political party in Uruguay.

Ideology 
The party seeks to unite moderate and liberal groups, although its members have had a diverse set of ideologies since its foundation, including Krausism, social democracy, and liberal conservatism, as well as general pragmatism. It was the dominant party of government almost without exception during the stabilization of the Uruguayan republic.

History 
At the 2004 national elections, the Colorado Party won 10 seats out of 99 in the Chamber of Representatives and 3 seats out of 31 in the Senate. Its presidential candidate, Guillermo Stirling, won 10.4% of the popular vote and placed third, ending the 10-year rule of Colorado Party and the two-party system.

Earlier history 
The Colorado Party was founded in Montevideo, Uruguay, on 17 September 1836.

Some of its major historical leaders were Fructuoso Rivera, Venancio Flores, José Batlle y Ordóñez, Luis Batlle Berres, Jorge Pacheco Areco, Juan María Bordaberry, Julio María Sanguinetti, Luis Bernardo Pozzolo, and Jorge Batlle.

The party has historically been the most elected party in Uruguayan history with almost uninterrupted dominance during the 20th century. The Colorados were in office from 1865 to 1959, when they were defeated by the Partido Nacional in the 1958 elections. They returned to office after the 1966 elections. They won the first elections at the end of the military dictatorship, in 1984. They went on to win the 1994 and 1999 elections.

Traditional rivals 
From its birth until the last decades of the 20th century its traditional rival was the conservative Partido Nacional (also called Partido Blanco).

Post 2004: defeat at polls and rise of Pedro Bordaberry Herrán 
The Colorado Party suffered its worst defeat ever in the 2004 national elections, with little over 10 per cent of the popular vote for its presidential candidate Guillermo Stirling, and having only three out of thirty national Senators. Reasons for the party's weak results were many, but these include the economic crisis and old party leaders.

Subsequently, to his defeat in 2004, Guillermo Stirling endorsed Pedro Bordaberry Herrán's Vamos Uruguay movement. Bordaberry Herrán became the presidential candidate for the 2009 presidential election, and placed third, with 17 percent of the vote, behind José Mujica and Luis Alberto Lacalle. Bordaberry Herrán placed third again in the 2014 presidential election, with 13% of the vote.

Electoral history

Presidential elections

Chamber of Deputies and Senate elections

National Council of Administration and National Council of Government elections

See also 

 Colorado Party (Paraguay)
 National Party (Uruguay)
 Liberalism worldwide
 List of liberal parties
 Liberalism in Uruguay
 Fructuoso Rivera
 José Batllé y Ordóñez
 Jorge Batlle
 Pedro Bordaberry

References 

 
Liberal parties in Uruguay
Political parties established in 1836
1836 establishments in Uruguay